Van Syckel may refer to:

 Van Syckel, New Jersey
 Bennet Van Syckel (1830–1921), Associate Justice of the New Jersey Supreme Court